A borderland or borderlands are the geographical space or zone around a territorial border.

Borderland or borderlands may refer to:

Places
 Borderland, West Virginia, an unincorporated community in Mingo County, West Virginia
 Borderland (electoral district), a provincial electoral district in Manitoba.
 Borderland State Park, one of Massachusetts' state parks, located in the towns of Easton and Sharon
Borderlands (United Kingdom), area of Great Britain
 The translation]of the name of Ukraine

Books
 Borderland (magazine), a spiritualism and psychical research magazine founded and edited by William Thomas Stead
 Borderlands (novel), a 1991 children's historical novel by author Peter Carter
 Borderland (book series), urban fantasy novels and stories created for teenage readers by Terri Windling
 Borderlands/La Frontera: The New Mestiza, influential work on Chicana issues by Gloria E. Anzaldúa
 "Up the Country" (originally "Borderland"), an 1892 popular poem by iconic Australian writer and poet Henry Lawson
 Borderlands series, a series of anthologies edited by Thomas F. Monteleone

Film and TV
 Borderland (1937 film), a 1937 film directed by Nate Watt
 Borderland (2007 film), a 2007 horror film written and directed by Zev Berman
 Borderland (1922 film), a 1922 American silent drama film
 "Borderland" (Star Trek: Enterprise), the 80th episode from the television series Star Trek: Enterprise
 "The Borderland", a 1963 episode of the original The Outer Limits television show
 The Borderlands (2013 film), a 2013 film directed by Elliot Goldner
 Borderlands (film), an adaptation of the video game franchise by Eli Roth
 Borderland (television series), a 2014 television documentary series

Games
Borderlands (series), a series of action role-playing first-person shooter video games including:
 Borderlands (video game), the first game in the series
 Borderlands 2, the second game in the series
 Borderlands: The Pre-Sequel, the third game in the series
 Tales from the Borderlands, a spin-off adventure game
 Borderlands 3, the fourth game in the series

Music

Albums
 Borderland (The Chevin album), 2012
 Borderland (John Mark McMillan album), 2014
 Borderlands, a 1987 album by Kathryn Tickell

Songs
 "Borderland", a song by Mami Kawada
 "Borderland", Secret Chiefs First Grand Constitution and Bylaws
 "Borderlands", a 1999 song by Jefferson Starship from Windows of Heaven

Other uses
 Borderland Derby, an American Thoroughbred horse race held annually early in the year at Sunland Park Racetrack
 Borderlands Books, a San Francisco independent bookstore specializing in science fiction, fantasy and horror
 Borderlands line, the railway line between Wrexham, Wales, and Bidston, Wirral, England

See also
 
 Frontier (disambiguation)